Leelavathi (born Leela Kiran) is an Indian actress who worked in Kannada, Tamil and Telugu films. She has acted in more than 600 films (more than 400 in Kannada alone) throughout her career for more than 50 years. She is known for her memorable performances in Bhakta Kumbara , Mana Mecchida Madadi and Santha Thukaram. She has been the recipient of the Dr. Rajkumar Award in 1999 and Filmfare Awards.

Early life
She was born at Beltangadi, Dakshina Kannada district. She lost her parents at the age of 6.

Film career
She got a small role in Chanchala Kumari and then in Shanker Singh's film Naga Kannika. She later joined the troupe of Mahalinga Bhagavathar's Sri Sahitya Samrajya Drama Company. It was from Rani Honnamma that Leelavathi became a full-fledged heroine. In Santha Thukaram, Kantheredu Nodu, Kaivara Mahatme, Gaali Gopura, Kanyarathna, Kulavadhu, Veera Kesari and Mana Mecchida Madadi , she was the leading lady. She has starred in supporting roles in Gejje Pooje and Doctor Krishna for which she received the Karnataka State Award.

She has the rare distinction of having worked with Rajkumar in various films as heroine as well as his daughter (in Bhoodana), sister (in Vathsalya), sister in law - elder brother's wife in Premamayi and younger brother's wife in Kalitharu Henne, paternal aunt (in Shravana Banthu) and mother in law (in Vasantha Geetha, Naa Ninna Mareyalare and Jwaalamukhi).

Awards and recognitions
 Dr. Rajkumar Lifetime Achievement Award in 2000 from Karnataka Government.
Filmfare Award for Best Supporting Actress – Kannada for Kannadada Kanda in 2006 
Leelavathi was conferred with the honorary doctorate from the Tumkur University in the year 2008 for her contribution to the southern cinema.

Partial filmography

As actress

First Film in Kannada: Mangalya Yoga
First Film in Tamil: Pattinathaar
First Film in Telugu: Marmayogi
First Film in Malayalam: Pamasiraja
First Film in Tulu: Saviradoorthi Savitri

As producer

References

External links
 

Actresses in Kannada cinema
Kannada actresses
Year of birth missing (living people)
Living people
Actresses in Tamil cinema
Actresses in Telugu cinema
Filmfare Awards South winners
Indian film actresses
20th-century Indian actresses
21st-century Indian actresses
Actresses from Mangalore
Kannada film producers
Indian women film producers
Film producers from Karnataka
Businesspeople from Mangalore
21st-century Indian businesswomen
21st-century Indian businesspeople
Businesswomen from Karnataka